Amolops longimanus is a species of frog in the family Ranidae that is found in Myanmar and possibly China.

References

longimanus
Amphibians described in 1939
Endemic fauna of Myanmar
Amphibians of Myanmar
Taxonomy articles created by Polbot